Derevnya Sharipovskogo uchastka (Şärip uçastkahı) is a rural locality (a village) in Novokainlykovsky Selsoviet, Krasnokamsky District, Bashkortostan, Russia. The population was 117 as of 2010. There are 2 streets.

Geography 
The village is located 43 km southeast of Nikolo-Beryozovka (the district's administrative centre) by road. Kuperbash is the nearest rural locality.

References 

Rural localities in Krasnokamsky District